HD 11964 c is an extrasolar planet approximately 110 light-years away in the constellation of Cetus.  The planet was discovered in a close-orbit around the yellow subgiant star HD 11964.  The planet has a minimum mass 35 times the mass of Earth and is located in a mildly eccentric orbit which takes almost 38 days to complete. HD 11964 c was a possible planet discovered on the same day as HD 11964 b in 2005. HD 11964 c was first proposed in a paper published in 2007, and finally confirmed with new data presented in a review of multi-planet systems which appeared on the arXiv preprint website in 2008.

Some sources have used the designation "HD 11964 b" for this planet, however in their review of the properties of multi-planet extrasolar planetary systems, the discovery team has stated that the correct designation for this planet is HD 11964 c and the reversed system was due to confusion related to private communications between various groups of astronomers.

References

Cetus (constellation)
Giant planets
Exoplanets discovered in 2005
Exoplanets detected by radial velocity